Katherine Christian Beath (married name McDougall; 20 December 1882 – 29 June 1979) was probably the first female architect in New Zealand.

Biography
Beath was born in Christchurch in 1882, the daughter of Marie Malcolm and George Low Beath, founder of the Christchurch department store Beath and Co. She was the niece of the  feminist Kate Sheppard and great aunt of architect Peter Beaven.

After completing her studies in 1904 at the Canterbury College School of Art in Christchurch, she trained as an architect under Samuel Hurst Seager from 1904 to 1908. She married Colin Barclay McDougall in 1915.

References

1882 births
1979 deaths
New Zealand women architects
People from Christchurch
20th-century New Zealand architects
20th-century New Zealand women